Baqai Medical University is a higher education institution located on M-9, Super Highway, Karachi, Pakistan.

Recognised university
It was founded in 1989 and is ranked number 7 in the Higher Education Commission of Pakistan rankings for medical universities in Pakistan as of 2013. It is also recognised by the Pakistan Medical and Dental Council.

History
Dr Fariduddin Baqai and his wife Dr Zahida Baqai were medical practitioners and surgeons who had been educated in Pakistan and the United Kingdom. They began to practice in Karachi, which at that time was the capital. In the late 1960s, the Baqais started a private sector hospital in Nazimabad, Karachi: the Baqai Hospital Nazimabad which later became a general hospital with 350 beds and modern facilities aimed at middle-income private patients, also doing charitable work.

In 1976, the Baqai Foundation acquired land on the outskirts of Karachi, on the M-9 Super Highway and founded the Baqai Medical Complex.

The Baqais convinced the government that health delivery could be through a programme of community-oriented medical education. This stimulated them to plan a medical college. In 1988, the first MBBS students were admitted, although it was not until 1990 that the Pakistan Medical and Dental Council formally permitted the college to start clinical teaching at Baqai Hospital, Nazimabad. In 1992, the Baqai Foundation went on to establish the Baqai Dental College for the huge city of Karachi.

Institutions
The institutions of the university include:
 Baqai Medical College
 Baqai Dental College
 Baqai College of Veterinary Sciences
 Baqai Cadet College
 Baqai Institute of Pharmaceutical Sciences
 Baqai Institute of Health Management Sciences
 Baqai Institute of Hematology
 Baqai Institute of Medical Technology
 Baqai Institute of Diabetology and Endocrinology
 Baqai Institute of Chest Diseases
 Baqai Institute of Cardiovascular Diseases
 Baqai Institute of Reproduction and Developmental Sciences
 Department of Social Obstetrics
 Baqai Institute of Information Technology
 Baqai Institute of Physical Therapy

Admissions
Merit is the only criterion for admission. There are no quotas, reserved places or places based on donations. In establishing merit, entrance tests, interviews, extra curricular activities and school records are used.

Faculty
Grants and scholarships are provided for faculty members to travel abroad to seminars and conferences and for higher education. The university has a programme of education through its Centre for Medical Education.

References

External links
Baqai Medical University official website

Universities and colleges in Karachi
Medical colleges in Sindh
Dental schools in Pakistan
Educational institutions established in 1989
1989 establishments in Pakistan